A Twal A Tar is a 1972 Burmese black-and-white drama film, directed by Win Oo starring Win Oo and Sandar Lin.

Cast
Win Oo as Win Zaw
Sandar Lin as Mi Chaw

References

1972 films
1970s Burmese-language films
Burmese drama films
Films shot in Myanmar
1972 drama films